Travis Smith is the name of:

Travis Smith (Oz), fictional character in the TV series Oz
Travis Smith (musician) (born 1982), American musician, drummer for Trivium
Travis Smith (baseball) (born 1972), American baseball player
Travis Smith (artist) (born 1970), American graphic artist
Travis Smith (cyclist) (born 1980), Canadian cyclist at the 2006 Commonwealth Games